Mann Alone is solo album by American jazz flautist Herbie Mann featuring tracks recorded in 1957 for the Savoy label.

Reception

Allmusic awarded the album 3 stars In the Honolulu Star-Bulletin, Seth Markow called it "an audacious album of solo flute".

Track listing
 "Happy Happy" - 3:30
 "Looking Thru the Window" - 4:00
 "Like, You Know, Baby" - 5:50
 "Love" - 5:15
 "All Day Monday" - 6:20
 "From Midnight On" - 3:25
 "For the Love of Kali" - 4:20
 "Ruth, Ruth" - 3:40

Personnel 
Herbie Mann - flute, alto flute

References 

1957 albums
Herbie Mann albums
Savoy Records albums